The 1906–07 season is the 33rd season of competitive football by Rangers.

Overview
Rangers played a total of 37 competitive matches during the 1906–07 season. The side finished third in the league, ten points behind champions Celtic, after winning 19 of the 34 matches.

The Scottish Cup campaign was ended at the hands of the league champions after a 3–0 home defeat. Rangers had beaten Falkirk and Galston en route to the quarter-finals.

Results
All results are written with Rangers' score first.

Scottish League Division One

Scottish Cup

Appearances

See also
 1906–07 in Scottish football
 1906–07 Scottish Cup

Rangers F.C. seasons
Rangers